Sir John Williams, 1st Baronet  (6 November 1840 – 24 May 1926), was a Welsh physician, who attended Queen Victoria of the United Kingdom and was raised to the baronetcy by her in 1894. He is remembered chiefly for his contribution to the collection of the National Library of Wales. He resided for part of his life at Plas Llanstephan, Carmarthenshire, a house he acquired by lease.

Education and medical career
John Williams was born in Gwynfe hamlet, Carmarthenshire, the son of David Williams (1802–1842), a Welsh Congregational minister, and his wife, Eleanor. He had four siblings. His father's elder brother, Morgan Williams (1800–1892) had 11 children, John's first cousins. Williams went to school in Swansea, then to the University of Glasgow, and finally to University College Hospital, London, to complete his medical studies: among other disbursements on his death he bequeathed £2,000 to the University College Hospital, London. In 1886 he became a private doctor to the royal family. As well as his career as an obstetric surgeon in London, he helped set up a Welsh hospital in South Africa during the Boer War, and was involved in the campaign against tuberculosis in his native country.

Williams was invested as a Knight Commander of the Royal Victorian Order (KCVO) during a visit to King Edward VII at Sandringham House on 29 December 1902, and was later promoted to a Knight Grand Cross (GCVO) of the order.

Bibliographical interests

Sir John's leisure hours were largely spent in the acquisition of a large private library, and in 1898, influenced by the palaeographer John Gwenogvryn Evans, he acquired the Hengwrt–Peniarth collection of manuscripts. These were donated to the new National Library of Wales when it was built at Aberystwyth. In 1907 he was appointed the first President of the National Library, and two years later moved to Aberystwyth to live. In 1913 he became President of the University College of Wales, Aberystwyth (now Aberystwyth University). On his death, he bequeathed the remainder of his books, plus a large sum of money, in trust to the National Library, and the other moiety of the residuary estate in trust to the University College of Wales.

Sir John presented a collection of some 1,200 manuscripts in total to the National Library, which divide into three groups: the 500 manuscripts from the Hengwrt–Peniarth collection; the Llanstephan collection of 200 manuscripts, including 154 from the Shirburn Castle library; and 500 Additional Manuscripts that he had collected from various sources. The majority of the manuscripts were acquired between 1894 and 1905 as part of the campaign to establish the National Library in Aberystwyth. In 1905, after it had been confirmed that Aberystwyth would be the Library's location, he almost entirely ceased to collect manuscripts.

Over 25,000 printed volumes were either donated to the National Library by Sir John in his lifetime or bequeathed on his death. The 193 books and pamphlets that he purchased from Shirburn Castle are considered the most valuable group in the collection as they include important examples of the earliest Welsh printed literature. Another important part of the collection comprises editions of Arthurian romance, including a single incunabulum, Lancelot du Lac (1488), and a copy of all the Kelmscott Press publications. There is much Welsh interest material, including significant items that Sir John acquired individually, collections that he bought intact, such as the 4,558 volume library of John Parry of Llanarmon-yn-Iâl, and portions of libraries, such as those of Reverend John Jenkins of Kerry and Reverend Robert Williams of Rhydycroesau. There is therefore some duplication of early Welsh books, and the collection is often rich in variants of the same edition.

Sir John also collected pictorial records of Welsh life and culture, via his network of contacts in the art trade, which provided a solid foundation for the National Library's collections of maps and art. This includes a set of S. H. Grimm's prints and drawings of Wales, plates of Samuel and Nathaniel Buck's views of Wales, drawings by Sir Edwin Landseer, aquatints by Paul Sandby, and Thomas Rowlandson's drawings of his 1796 tour of Wales. There are also pictures attributed to masters such as Van Dyck, Gainsborough and Turner.

Personal life
Williams married Mary Hughes in 1872. There were no children of the marriage.

Jack the Ripper accusation
Sir John was accused of the Ripper crimes in a 2005 book, Uncle Jack, written by one of his distant relatives, Tony (Michael Anthony) Williams, and co-authored by Humphrey Price. The authors assert that the victims knew the doctor personally, and that they were killed and mutilated in an attempt to research the causes of infertility. The book also asserts that a badly blunted surgical knife, which belonged to Sir John, was the murder weapon. Serious doubts were raised by others about the authors' competence and motivation.

References

External links
Welsh Biography Online

1840 births
1926 deaths
19th-century Welsh medical doctors
Baronets in the Baronetage of the United Kingdom
Jack the Ripper
Knights Grand Cross of the Royal Victorian Order
Welsh book and manuscript collectors